American rapper Wiz Khalifa has released seven studio albums, one compilation album, one soundtrack album, three extended plays (EP), two collaborative albums, 84 singles (including 44 as a featured artist), sixteen promotional singles, twenty-one mixtapes, and 82 music videos. After signing to independent record label Rostrum Records at a young age, Khalifa released his first mixtape Prince of the City: Welcome to Pistolvania, and his first studio album, Show and Prove (2006). Following the release of Show and Prove, Warner Bros. Records signed Khalifa in 2007 as part of a joint deal with Rostrum. At Warner, Khalifa released the singles "Youngin' on His Grind" and "Say Yeah". The latter became his first song to appear on a Billboard chart, peaking at number 20 on the US Hot Rap Songs. Disagreements with Warner over the release of a purported major-label debut album led Khalifa to departed from the label, and release his second studio album Deal or No Deal in 2009 on Rostrum Records alone.

In April 2010, Khalifa released a mixtape, Kush & Orange Juice, which acquired widespread attention after topping Google's Hot Search Trends list: this brought Khalifa to the attention of Atlantic Records, who promptly signed him. Khalifa's first single for the label, "Black and Yellow", achieved significant commercial success in the United States, peaking at number one on the US Billboard Hot 100 and also peaking in the top ten of both the Canadian and United Kingdom singles charts. The song was later certified six-times platinum by the Recording Industry Association of America (RIAA) for digital download shipments exceeding 6,000,000 copies. The International Hit "Black and Yellow" appeared on Khalifa's first studio album for Atlantic (and third overall), Rolling Papers, which peaked at number two on the US Billboard 200 and was certified gold by the RIAA. Three further singles from Rolling Papers, Billboard Singles "Roll Up", "On My Level" – a collaboration with fellow rapper Too Short – and "No Sleep" also charted in the United States. In 2011, Khalifa recorded many collaborations with other artists that proved to be commercially successful, including "5 O'Clock" with T-Pain and Lily Allen, and "Young, Wild & Free" with Snoop Dogg. Both of these songs reached the top 10 of the Billboard Hot 100.

In 2012, Khalifa's fourth studio album, O.N.I.F.C., was preceded by the release of the singles "Work Hard, Play Hard" and "Remember You", which both charted in the top 75 of the Billboard Hot 100. Several other songs from O.N.I.F.C. also charted upon the album's release. "Let It Go" featuring Akon debuted and peaked at number 87 on the Billboard Hot 100. Following the release of "Work Hard, Play Hard", Khalifa collaborated with pop rock band Maroon 5 on the single "Payphone", which reached number two on the Billboard Hot 100 and entered the top ten of many other national charts, including those of Australia, New Zealand and Switzerland. "Payphone" was particularly successful on the UK Singles Chart, where it became Khalifa's first single to top the chart. Following its release in the United States on December 4, 2012, O.N.I.F.C. charted at number two on the Billboard 200 and topped both the Top R&B/Hip-Hop Albums and Top Rap Albums charts. Blacc Hollywood followed in 2014 and included the single "We Dem Boyz", which peaked at number 43 on the Billboard Hot 100. Khalifa, a compilation album composed of songs from 2009 onwards, was released on February 5, 2016, and spawned a moderate hit with the single "Bake Sale" (featuring Travis Scott). The sequel to his debut album with Atlantic Records, Rolling Papers 2 was released in 2018 and peaked at number 2 on the Billboard 200.

Albums

Studio albums

Collaborative albums

Compilation albums

Soundtrack albums

EPs

Mixtapes

Singles

As lead artist

As featured artist

Promotional singles

Other charted songs

Guest appearances

Music videos

As lead artist

As featured artist

Cameo appearances

Notes

References

External links
 
 
 Wiz Khalifa at Discogs

Discographies of American artists
Hip hop discographies
Pop music discographies